Michael Hughes (February 9, 1956 – February 22, 2020), popularly known as "Mad" Mike Hughes, was an American limousine driver, professed flat-Earther, and daredevil known for flying in self-built steam rockets. He died on February 22, 2020, while filming a stunt for an upcoming Science Channel television series. Although a public promoter of the flat Earth model, following his death his public relations representative said that Hughes had only used flat Earth as a PR stunt to acquire funding for his rockets.

Background 
Hughes spent his childhood in Oklahoma City. He soon acquired an interest in motorcycle racing.

In 2002, Hughes set a Guinness World Record with a  jump in a Lincoln Town Car stretch limousine. He stated during an interview with the Associated Press in 2018 that he had planned to run for Governor of California.

At the time of his death, Hughes lived in Apple Valley, California.

Rocket launches

2014 launch
According to the Associated Press, Hughes built his first crewed rocket on January 30, 2014, and flew  in just over one minute over Winkelman, Arizona. According to CBC News, Hughes collapsed after the landing and it took him three days to recover. Hughes stated that the injuries suffered from the flight put him in a walker for two weeks. There was no video of Hughes entering the rocket and there were doubts that he was in it when it launched.

Flat-Earth rocket fundraising and launch 
In 2016, Hughes launched a failed fundraising attempt for a rocket that raised $310. After professing his belief in a flat Earth later that year, Hughes gained support within the flat-Earth community. His post-flat-Earth fundraising campaign made its $7,875 goal. He had said he intended to make multiple rocket journeys, culminating in a flight to outer space, where he believed he would be able to take a picture of the entire Earth as a flat disc. He said in November 2017 that the Bureau of Land Management (BLM) had given him verbal permission more than a year prior to launch his rocket, pending approval from the Federal Aviation Administration. However, a BLM spokesman said its local field office had no record of speaking to Hughes at the time. According to the BLM, after seeing some news articles about the planned launch, a BLM representative reached out to Hughes with concerns. The rocket launch was originally scheduled for the weekend of November 25, 2017; Hughes then rescheduled for December 2, 2017, blaming ongoing difficulties in obtaining permissions. Hughes moved his launch pad  so that he could take off and land on private property, but the BLM maintained he still needed to fill out permits. Hughes defiantly stated that the dispute would not stop him from flying: "I'm a daredevil. I'm not much for authority or rules."

Hughes acknowledged there were risks, telling the Associated Press: "It's scary as hell. But none of us are getting out of this world alive." A fundraising campaign to cover the costs of the delay raised around $100 of its $10,000 goal. On February 3, 2018, Hughes live-streamed another attempted launch, but the rocket steam release malfunctioned and the launch was aborted.

Hughes reported no serious injury from the landing.

Planned 2019 launch 
Hughes planned to again launch himself in a rocket on August 10, 2019, but mechanical troubles postponed the launch. The following weekend, the launch was again postponed and Hughes was treated for heat exhaustion.

2020 launch and death 
On February 22, 2020, Hughes died near Barstow, California, following the crash of a rocket he was piloting, built by Hughes and his collaborator Waldo Stakes. During launch, the rocket's parachute, which was designed for landing, appeared to deploy early and detach from the craft. A witness at the launch, freelance journalist Justin Chapman, said that the rocket appeared to rub against the launch apparatus and ladder, perhaps tearing the parachutes. The launch event was being filmed for the Science Channel television series Homemade Astronauts, in which Hughes was to star.

Following Hughes' death, Darren Shuster, his public relations representative, stated: "We used flat Earth as a PR stunt... Flat Earth allowed us to get so much publicity that we kept going! I know he didn’t believe in flat Earth and it was a schtick."

In popular culture 
Hughes appeared in the music video for the Death Valley Girls' song "One Less Thing (Before I Die)". The 1:53 min long video was directed by Kansas Bowling and featured footage of his "Flat Earth" rocket launch in Apple Valley.

Hughes was the main focus of the 2019 documentary Rocketman: Mad Mike's Mission to Prove the Flat-Earth.

See also 
 Amateur rocketry
 Homebuilt aircraft
 List of inventors killed by their own inventions
 Myth of the flat Earth

References

Further reading

External links 
 Fox News interview, July 2019
 
  (0:33 min) (Flight of 22 February 2020)

1956 births
2020 deaths
Accidental deaths in California
American stunt performers
American conspiracy theorists
Flat Earth proponents
People from Apple Valley, California
Sportspeople from Oklahoma City
Amateur crewed rocketry
Inventors killed by their own invention
Filmed deaths from falls
Filmed deaths in the United States